Paula Bossio is an internationally recognized author and illustrator who lives in Melbourne, Australia.

Bossio studied graphic design in Colombia, and has worked as a freelance illustrator in publishing and advertising industries from 2000. Her board book, El Lápiz was published in English in 2016.

English translations

2016 – The Pencil, 24pp.,

International recognition
2002 – Noma Concours for Picture Book Illustrations, Runner Up Prize
2004 – Noma Concours for Picture Book Illustrations, Encouragement Prize 
2009 – Katha Chitrakala, Runner Up Prize
2010 – A la Orilla del Viento , administered by the Fondo de Cultura Económica, Honorable Mention

References

Australian women illustrators
Australian women writers
Year of birth missing (living people)
Living people
Writers from Melbourne